Secret Warriors may refer to:
 Secret Warriors (comic book)
 Secret Warriors (Team White), the original team in Marvel Comics
 Secret Warriors (2009 series)
 Secret Warriors (2017 series)
 Marvel Rising: Secret Warriors, a 2018 animated film